Jacaranda micrantha is a species of flowering plant, a tree in the family Bignoniaceae.

Jacaranda micrantha is a deciduous tree and typically grows 8 to 20 meters in height and 70 centimeters in diameter. The tree is harvested from the wild as source for medicine and wood to the locals.

It is native to Argentina, Brazil, and Paraguay.

References

Flora of Brazil
Flora of Argentina
Flora of Paraguay
micrantha